13070 Seanconnery, provisional designation , is a background asteroid from the inner regions of the asteroid belt, approximately 3 kilometers in diameter. It was discovered on 8 September 1991, by Belgian astronomer Eric Elst at Haute-Provence Observatory, St. Michael, in southeast France. The asteroid was named after actor Sean Connery.

Orbit and classification 

Seanconnery is a non-family asteroid from the main belt's background population. It orbits the Sun in the inner asteroid belt at a distance of 1.8–3.1 AU once every 3 years and 9 months (1,382 days). Its orbit has an eccentricity of 0.28 and an inclination of 6° with respect to the ecliptic. The asteroid's observation arc begins 20 years prior to its official discovery observation, with its identification  made during the first Palomar–Leiden Trojan survey in 1971.

Physical characteristics

Rotation period 

In August 2006, a rotational lightcurve of Seanconnery was obtained from photometric observations made at the Hunters Hill Observatory in Ngunnawal, Australia. The lightcurve gave a well-defined rotation period of  hours with a brightness amplitude of 0.18 in magnitude.

Diameter and albedo 

According to the survey carried out by the NEOWISE mission of NASA's space-based Wide-field Infrared Survey Explorer, Seanconnery has an outstandingly high albedo of 0.90 and a diameter of 1.8 kilometers. The Collaborative Asteroid Lightcurve Link assumes a standard albedo for stony asteroids of 0.20 and calculates a diameter 3.6 kilometers, as the lower the albedo (reflectivity), the larger an asteroid's diameter for a certain absolute magnitude (brightness).

Naming 

This minor planet was named for celebrated Scottish actor and Academy Award winner Sean Connery (1930–2020), famous for portraying the character James Bond – after which the minor planet 9007 James Bond is named, starring in seven Bond films between 1962 and 1983. With this minor planet, he is especially honored by the discoverer for his performance as the Franciscan friar William of Baskerville in The Name of the Rose. The official naming citation was published by the Minor Planet Center on 9 March 2001 .

References

External links 
 AstDyS-2, (13070) Seanconnery
 Asteroid Lightcurve Database (LCDB), query form (info )
 Dictionary of Minor Planet Names, Google books
 Asteroids and comets rotation curves, CdR – Observatoire de Genève, Raoul Behrend
 Discovery Circumstances: Numbered Minor Planets (10001)-(15000) – Minor Planet Center
 
 

013070
Discoveries by Eric Walter Elst
Named minor planets
1127
19910908